Live in Paris is an album by jazz musician John Coltrane originally issued as 2 separate volumes in 1974 by BYG Japan and later reissued on CD by Charly Records.

Background
Live in Paris was recorded in the middle of one of Coltrane's busiest summers. On June 28, 1965, he recorded the groundbreaking album Ascension, followed by New Thing at Newport four days later. This was followed by a two-week double bill with Thelonious Monk's quartet at the Village Gate from July 6–18.

Coltrane and his quartet then embarked on a one-week tour of Europe, playing at the sixth International Jazz Festival at Juan-les-Pins in Antibes, France on July 26 and 27, followed by a concert at the Salle Pleyel in Paris on July 28, and winding up with a performance at a jazz festival in Comblain-la-Tour, Belgium on August 1. The July 26 concert, on which Coltrane shared billing with Jimmy McGriff, featured his only live performance of A Love Supreme, a 48-minute version which took up the entire program. (A recording of this concert appears on the 2002 Deluxe Edition and the 2015 Super Deluxe Edition of A Love Supreme.) The following day, at the request of the festival, Coltrane performed material that was more familiar to the audience. The versions of "Naima" and "Impressions" on Live in Paris were recorded that day. The remaining tracks, "Blue Valse", "Afro-Blue", and a second version of "Impressions", were recorded at the July 28 concert in Paris. ("Blue Valse" is actually a quartet version of "Ascension", and was mis-titled due to a miscommunication with concert personnel.)

Some of the music recorded in France during the tour was also released in 1988 on Live in Antibes.

The July–August 1965 tour marked Coltrane's last appearance in Europe.

On the tour, during breaks, Coltrane frequently "remained... in his hotel room, practicing as usual, playing along to a tape of an [Albert] Ayler concert."

Reception

In a review for AllMusic, Stephen Cook wrote that Live in Paris shows Coltrane "dismissing solo structure in favor of volcanic flights", and said that his performance on "Naima" was "one of his most beautiful and emotionally bare solos." He stated: "This disc provides a valuable document of Coltrane's playing during a fertile and protean period (one of many)."

Track listing
Original CD release (mastered from a vinyl source) Live in Paris (Affinity CHARLY 87).
 "Naima" - 7:14
 "Impressions" - 11:18
 "Blue Valse” - 22:42
 "Afro-Blue” - 11:01
 "Impressions” - 16:15

Tracks 1 and 2 were recorded on July 27, 1965 at the Antibes Jazz Festival.
Tracks 3, 4, and 5 were recorded on July 28, 1965 at the Salle Pleyel, Paris, France.

Personnel
 John Coltrane — tenor saxophone/soprano saxophone
 McCoy Tyner — piano
 Jimmy Garrison — double bass
 Elvin Jones — drums

References

John Coltrane live albums
1965 live albums
Charly Records live albums
Albums recorded at Jazz à Juan